Time Stands Still is the fourth album from Family Force 5. Word Records released the project on August 5, 2014. Family Force 5 worked with Nathan Currin, Riley Friesen, Seth Mosley, Derek Mount, Solomon Olds, and Jacob Olds on the production of this album.

Reception

Signaling in a three star out of five review by CCM Magazine, Matt Conner realizes, "While substantive moments are scattered throughout... the album reflects a new season of life and maturation for the band." John "Flip" Choquette, writes in a four and a half star review from Jesus Freak Hideout, recognizing, "Each and every song, while unique in its own way, delivers the signature energy and sound that the band is known for." Shaving a half star off her rating compared to the aforementioned one, New Release Tuesday's Mary Nikkel discerns, "With Time Stands Still, Family Force 5 serves up songs on fire with a passion for life that is instantly infectious."

Tracks

Charts

References

2014 albums
Family Force 5 albums
Word Records albums